Route 422, also known as Cormack Road, is a relatively short highway on western Newfoundland in the Canadian province of Newfoundland and Labrador. The route travels through its only community, Cormack, and to Sir Richard Squires Memorial Provincial Park.

Route description

Route 422 begins at an intersection with Route 430 (Great Northern Peninsula Highway/Viking Trail) just north of Deer Lake and it heads northeast to immediately cross a brook. The highway heads through rural farmland for several kilometres to pass through the centre of Cormack as Veterans Drive. Route 422 now turns to gravel as it turns southeast through wooded areas to cross the Humber River and pass by Sir Richard Squires Memorial Provincial Park. The highway now winds its way east through more wooded terrain for several kilometres before coming to an end at an unmarked intersection with Route 420 (White Bay South Highway), just a half kilometre north of its intersection with Route 1 (Trans-Canada Highway). There is no signage of any kind at the intersection between Route 422 and Route 420.

Major intersections

References

422